Epiestriol may refer to:

 16β-Epiestriol (16β-hydroxy-17β-estradiol)
 17α-Epiestriol (16α-hydroxy-17α-estradiol)
 16β,17α-Epiestriol (16β-hydroxy-17α-estradiol)

Estranes
Triols